Federation, Action for the Republic (FAR/Parti Fédération) is a political party in Chad. It is considered a radical opposition party and is led by Ngarlejy Yorongar. The FAR supports federalism. 

In the 1997 parliamentary election, the FAR won one seat in the National Assembly. Yorongar was the only FAR candidate to win a seat.

Its candidate for the 20 May 2001 presidential election, Yorongar, has been a prominent critic of the Chad-Cameroon pipeline. According to official results, he won 396,864 votes or 6.35%. Six opposition candidates were detained on May 30 after contesting the results. Yorongar was tortured, along with Abderhamane Djesnebaye, including by being beaten with iron bars.

In the parliamentary election held on 21 April 2002, the party won 10 out of 155 seats.

The FAR was the only major opposition party to not sign an agreement on August 13, 2007 that provided for improved electoral organization ahead of the next parliamentary election, now planned for 2009. Yorongar criticized the agreement as inadequate and said that there should instead be a dialogue involving the entire political scene, including rebels, the exiled opposition, and civil society, and that a credible election could not be conducted while a rebellion was taking place in part of the country.

References

Federalist parties
Political parties in Chad